Joan, Countess of Kent (29 September 1326/1327 – 7 August 1385), known as The Fair Maid of Kent, was the mother of King Richard II of England, her son by her third husband, Edward the Black Prince, son and heir apparent of King Edward III. Although the French chronicler Jean Froissart called her "the most beautiful woman in all the realm of England, and the most loving", the appellation "Fair Maid of Kent" does not appear to be contemporary. Joan inherited the titles 4th Countess of Kent and 5th Baroness Wake of Liddell after the death of her brother John, 3rd Earl of Kent, in 1352. Joan was made a Lady of the Garter in 1378.

Early life

Joan was born on 29 September of either 1326 or 1327 and was the daughter of Edmund of Woodstock, 1st Earl of Kent (1301-1330), by his wife, Margaret Wake, 3rd Baroness Wake of Liddell. Edmund was the sixth son of King Edward I of England by his second wife, Margaret of France, daughter of King Philip III of France. Edmund was always a loyal supporter of his eldest half-brother, King Edward II, which placed him in conflict with that monarch's wife, Queen Isabella of France and her lover Roger Mortimer, 1st Earl of March. Edmund was executed in 1330 after Edward II was deposed; and Edmund's widow and four children (including Joan, who was only two years old at the time) were placed under house arrest in Arundel Castle in Sussex, which had been granted to Edmund in 1326 by his half-brother the king following the execution of the rebel Edmund FitzAlan, 9th Earl of Arundel. It was a time of great strain for the widowed Countess of Kent and her four children. They received respite after the new king, Edward III (Joan's half-first cousin), reached adulthood and took charge of affairs. He took on the responsibility for the family and looked after them well.

Early marriages

In 1340, at the age of about thirteen, Joan secretly married 26-year-old Thomas Holland of Up Holland, Lancashire, without first gaining the royal consent necessary for couples of their rank. Shortly after the wedding, Holland left for the continent as part of the English expedition into Flanders and France. The following winter (1340 or 1341), while Holland was overseas, Joan's family arranged for her to marry William Montagu, son and heir of William Montagu, 1st Earl of Salisbury. It is not known if Joan confided to anyone about her first marriage before marrying Montagu, who was her own age. Later, Joan indicated that she had not announced her existing marriage with Thomas Holland because she was afraid it would lead to Holland's execution for treason. She may also have been influenced to believe that the earlier marriage was invalid. Montagu's father died in 1344, and he became the 2nd Earl of Salisbury.

When Holland returned from the French campaigns in about 1348, his marriage to Joan was revealed. Holland confessed the secret marriage to the King and appealed to the Pope for the return of his wife. Salisbury held Joan captive so that she could not testify until the Church ordered him to release her. In 1349, the proceedings ruled in Holland's favor.  Pope Clement VI annulled Joan's marriage to Salisbury and Joan and Thomas Holland were ordered to be married in the Church.

Over the next eleven years, Thomas Holland and Joan had five children:

 Thomas Holland, 2nd Earl of Kent (1350 – 25 April 1397), who married Lady Alice FitzAlan (c. 1350 – 17 March 1416), daughter of Richard FitzAlan, 10th Earl of Arundel and 8th Earl of Surrey, and Lady Eleanor of Lancaster.
 John Holland, 1st Duke of Exeter and 1st Earl of Huntingdon (c. 1352 – 16 January 1400), who married Lady Elizabeth of Lancaster (c. 1363 – 24 November 1426), daughter of John of Gaunt, 1st Duke of Lancaster, and Lady Blanche of Lancaster.
 Lady Joan Holland (1356 – October 1384), who married John IV, Duke of Brittany (1339 – 1 November 1399).
 Lady Maud Holland (1359 – 13 April 1392), who married firstly Hugh Courtenay (c. 1345 – 20 February 1374), heir apparent to the earldom of Devon, and secondly Waleran III of Luxembourg, Count of Ligny and Saint-Pol (1355 – 12 April 1415).
 Edmund Holland (c. 1354), who died young. He was buried in the church of Austin Friars, London.

When the last of Joan's siblings died in 1352, the lands and titles of her parents devolved upon her, and she became the 4th Countess of Kent and 5th Baroness Wake of Liddell. Her husband Holland was created Earl of Kent in right of his wife in 1360.

Marriage to the Black Prince
The death of Joan's first husband, Thomas Holland, in 1360 made her an attractive marriage prospect for Edward, the Black Prince, the son of her half-first cousin King Edward III. Some may infer that evidence of a long-held desire by Edward for Joan may be found in the record of his presenting her with a silver cup, part of the booty from one of his early military campaigns. Although one generation removed from her, he was only three or four years younger than she was (depending on whether she was born in 1326 or 1327). It is suggested that Edward's parents did not favour a marriage between their son and their former ward, but this may be contradicted by the fact that King Edward assisted his son in acquiring all four of the needed dispensations for Edward to marry Joan. Among the problems was Edward and Joan's birth placement within the prohibited degrees of consanguinity. Queen Philippa (wife of Edward III) had made a favourite of Joan in her childhood. Both she and the King may have been concerned about the legitimacy of any resulting children, considering Joan's complicated marital record, but such concerns were remedied by a second ruling of Pope Clement's successor Innocent VI that held the initial ruling on Joan's previous marriage attempts.

At the King's request, the Pope granted the four dispensations needed to allow the two to be legally married. Matters moved fast, and Joan was officially married to the Prince barely nine months after Holland's death. The official ceremony took place on 10 October 1361 at Windsor Castle, with the King and Queen in attendance. The Archbishop of Canterbury presided.

In 1362, the Black Prince was invested as Prince of Aquitaine, a region of France that had belonged to the English Crown since the marriage of Eleanor of Aquitaine to Henry II of England in 1152. He and Joan moved to Bordeaux, the capital of the principality, where they spent the next nine years. Two sons were born during this period to the royal couple. The elder son, Edward of Angoulême (1365-1370), died at the age of five. At about the time of the birth of their younger son, the future King Richard II, the Black Prince was lured into a battle on behalf of King Peter of Castile and achieved one of his greatest victories. King Peter, however, was later killed, and there was no money to pay the troops. In the meantime, the Princess was forced to raise another army as her husband's enemies were threatening Aquitaine in his absence.

Transition to Dowager Princess of Wales
By 1371, the Black Prince was no longer able to perform his duties as Prince of Aquitaine due to poor health, thus he and Joan returned to England shortly after burying their elder son. In 1372, the Black Prince forced himself to attempt one final, abortive campaign in the hope of saving his father's French possessions, but the exertion completely shattered his health. He returned to England for the last time on 7 June 1376, a week before his forty-sixth birthday, and died in his bed at the Palace of Westminster the next day.

Joan's son Prince Richard was now next in line to succeed his grandfather Edward III, who died on 21 June 1377. Richard was crowned as Richard II the following month at the age of 10. Early in his reign, the young King faced the challenge of the Peasants' Revolt. The Lollards, religious reformers led by John Wyclif, had enjoyed Joan's support, but the violent climax of the popular movement for reform reduced the feisty Joan to a state of terror, while leaving the King with an improved reputation.

As the King's mother, Joan exercised much influence behind the scenes and was recognised for her contributions during the early years of her son's reign. She also enjoyed a certain respect among the people as a venerable royal dowager. For example, on her return to London from a pilgrimage to Thomas Becket's shrine at Canterbury Cathedral in 1381, she found her way barred by Wat Tyler and his mob of rebels on Blackheath. Not only was she let through unharmed, but she was saluted with kisses and provided with an escort for the rest of her journey.

In January 1382, Richard II married Anne of Bohemia, daughter of Charles IV, Holy Roman Emperor and King of Bohemia.

Death and burial

John Holland, 1st Duke of Exeter, was Joan's son by her first marriage; his wife Elizabeth of Lancaster was a daughter of John of Gaunt, 1st Duke of Lancaster, brother of the Black Prince. In 1385, while campaigning with his half-brother King Richard II in the Kingdom of Scotland, John Holland became involved in a quarrel with Sir Ralph Stafford, son of the 2nd Earl of Stafford, a favourite of Queen Anne of Bohemia. Stafford was killed and John Holland sought sanctuary at the shrine of St John of Beverley. On the King's return, Holland was condemned to death. Joan pleaded with her royal son for four days to spare his half-brother, and on the fifth day (the exact date in August is not known), she died at Wallingford Castle. King Richard then relented and pardoned Holland, who was sent on a pilgrimage to the Holy Land.

Joan was buried beside her first husband, as requested in her will, at the Greyfriars in Stamford, Lincolnshire. The Black Prince had built a chantry chapel for her in the crypt of Canterbury Cathedral in Kent (where he himself was buried), with ceiling bosses sculpted with likenesses of her face. Another boss in the north nave aisle is also said to show her face.

Family tree

Notes

References

Bibliography 

Goodman, Anthony, (2017) Joan, the Fair Maid of Kent: A Fourteenth-Century Princess and her World, The Boydell Press, Woodbridge  
 Lawne, Penny, (2015) Joan of Kent: The First Princess of Wales, Amberley Publishing, Gloucestershire
 
  
 The Times Kings & Queens of The British Isles by Thomas Cussans (page 92);  
 

1320s births
1385 deaths
Year of birth uncertain
Daughters of British earls
English princesses
Kent
House of Plantagenet
Ladies of the Garter
14th-century English nobility
14th-century English women
People from Wallingford, Oxfordshire
Princesses of Wales
Duchesses of Aquitaine
Hereditary women peers
Holland family
Kent, Joan, Countess of
5
Duchesses of Cornwall
Wives of knights